Agneta Marell (born 1964 in Gothenburg, Sweden) is professor in Business Administration and since 2010, Deputy vice-chancellor for external relations and innovation at Umeå University in northern Sweden. Between 2004 and 2007, she was the Dean of Umeå School of Business, succeeding Anders Söderholm. In 2008–2011, she was a municipal manager for Örnsköldsvik municipality. She received the assignment as vice rector for collaboration and innovation at Umeå University. As such, she was also chairman of Uminova Holding, the business incubator Uminova Innovation AB and Uminova eXpression AB, which runs Sliperiet at the Umeå Arts Campus.

In April 2016, she was appointed by the Swedish government to the board of Jönköping University for the period May 1, 2016 to April 30, 2017.

Since 2017, Agneta Marell is president at Jönköping University.

Research 
Marell graduated in Business Administration 1991, and finished her doctoral thesis in 1998. Her dissertation focused on consumer behaviour and transport psychology. She has also been studying at Columbia University in New York, and Kellogg School of Management at Northwestern University in Chicago.

Selected books (in English)

See also
Agneta Marell, Deputy Vice-Chancellor at Umeå University

References

1964 births
Living people
Swedish business theorists
Swedish educators
Academic staff of Umeå University
Umeå University alumni
Kellogg School of Management alumni
Columbia University alumni
Swedish women academics